Wiley may refer to:

Locations
 Wiley, Colorado, a U.S. town
Wiley, Pleasants County, West Virginia, U.S.
 Wiley-Kaserne, a district of the city of Neu-Ulm, Germany

People
 Wiley (musician), British grime MC, rapper, and producer
 Wiley Miller, pen name of American newspaper cartoonist David Wiley Miller

Given name
 Wiley Brooks  (1936–2016), founder of the Breatharian Institute of America
 Wiley Young Daniel, American judge
 Wiley Nickel, American politician
 Wiley Post (1898–1935), American aviator, the first person to fly solo around the world
 Wiley Rutledge (1894–1949), American jurist, Supreme Court justice
 Wiley Scribner (1840–1889), American politician
 Wiley Wiggins, American game designer and actor

Surname
 Alan Wiley, British football referee
 Alexander Wiley, U.S. Senator
 Austin Wiley, American basketball player
 Autrey Nell Wiley, American literary critic
 Cliff Wiley, American track and field athlete
 Charles Wiley, American printer and publisher
 D'Extra Wiley, American R&B singer, artist and producer, songwriter
 Daniel Day Wiley, American Union brevet brigadier general
 David Wiley (disambiguation), multiple people
 Don Craig Wiley, American crystallographer
 Geeshie Wiley, American blues singer of the early 1930s
 Gerald Wiley, nom-de-plume of Ronnie Barker
 Grace Olive Wiley, American herpetologist best known for her work with venomous snakes
 Harvey Washington Wiley, American chemist
 Isaac William Wiley (1825–1924), American physician and Methodist bishop, founder of Wiley College, Texas
 Jacob Wiley, American basketball player
 Janet Wiley, All-American Girls Professional Baseball League player
 John C. Wiley, American ambassador
 John D. Wiley, Chancellor of UW-Madison
 Kehinde Wiley, American artist
 Laura I. Wiley, American politician
 Lee Wiley, American jazz singer of the 1930s
 Marcellus Wiley, American football player
 Maya Wiley, American civil rights activist, lawyer, and politician
 Morlon Wiley, American basketball player and coach
 Nathan Wiley, Canadian musician
 Henry Orton Wiley, American Nazarene theologian
 Ralph Wiley, American sports journalist
 Ralph Wiley, chemist who accidentally discovered PVDC in 1933
 Richard E. Wiley, American lawyer and former Chairman of the Federal Communications
 Robert Wiley, Australian rules footballer
 Samira Wiley, American actor and model
 Stephen B. Wiley, American attorney, businessman, poet, and politician
 William Wiley, American sailor in the First Barbary War and namesake of the USS Wiley
 William H. Wiley, Representative to United States Congress from New Jersey and Publisher
 William T. Wiley, American artist

Fictional characters
 Bob Wiley, in the 1991 movie What About Bob?
 Wiley the Sheep, from Jakers! The Adventures of Piggley Winks

Other uses
 Wiley (publisher), a publishing company also known as John Wiley & Sons
 Wiley-Blackwell, an imprint of the publisher
 Wiley College, Texas, U.S.
 Wiley Rein, a U.S. law firm
 USS Wiley (DD-597), a U.S. warship

See also
 Whiley
 Wile E. Coyote and the Road Runner; the cartoon coyote character's name and "Wily" are homophones
 Willey (disambiguation)
 Wily (disambiguation)
 Wyle (disambiguation)
 Wylie (disambiguation)
 Wyllie
 Wyly
 Wylye (disambiguation)

English-language surnames